Jaramillo Creek is a 10 mile long stream in New Mexico with headwaters in the Jemez Mountains. Jaramillo is a tributary of the East Fork Jemez which is then a tributary of the Jemez River, a tributary of the Rio Grande. The creek is located in a graben in the Pleistocene age Valles Caldera.  The Jaramillo normal event (1.06-0.9 Mya) of the Matumaya Reversed Epoch was named for rocks selected and aged at the type locality near the creek.

See also
List of rivers of New Mexico

References

Jemez Mountains
Rivers of New Mexico
Rivers of Los Alamos County, New Mexico